Romsey was a seat of the House of Commons of the UK Parliament 1983–2010 which accordingly (as with all seats since 1950) elected one Member of Parliament (MP) by the first past the post system of election.  It is virtually tantamount to its replacement Romsey and Southampton North which takes in two typical-size local government wards of the United Kingdom named after and approximate to the Bassett and Swaythling parts of Southampton.

Boundaries

1983–1997: The Borough of Test Valley wards of Abbey, Blackwater, Chilworth and Nursling, Cuppernham, Field, North Baddesley, Romsey Extra, and Tadburn, and the District of New Forest wards of Blackfield and Langley, Colbury, Dibden and Hythe North, Dibden Purlieu, Fawley Holbury, Hythe South, Marchwood, Netley Marsh, Totton Central, Totton North, and Totton South.

1997–2010: The Borough of Test Valley wards of Abbey, Blackwater, Chilworth and Nursling, Cuppernham, Dun Valley, Field, Harewood, Kings Somborne and Michelmersh, Nether Wallop and Broughton, North Baddesley, Over Wallop, Romsey Extra, Stockbridge, and Tadburn, the Borough of Eastleigh wards of Chandler's Ford, Hiltingbury East, and Hiltingbury West, and the City of Southampton ward of Bassett.

The constituency was approximate to the Test Valley district of Hampshire and covered a smaller area as parts of the north of Test Valley fell into part of the North West Hampshire seat to roughly ensure equal size electorates (low malapportionment). The main town within the constituency was Romsey.

History
The constituency was created in 1983 from parts of the seats of Eastleigh and New Forest. It was originally named Romsey and Waterside and included areas such as Hythe and Fawley on the west side of Southampton Water. In 1997 it lost the Waterside area and gained the Bassett Ward of the City of Southampton, and new territory in the north of the Test Valley district, and was consequently renamed to just Romsey. The first MP, Michael Colvin, held the constituency from its creation until his death in 2000. This led to a by-election, which was won by Liberal Democrat Sandra Gidley, who held the seat in the two subsequent General Elections.

Following their review of parliamentary representation in Hampshire, the Boundary Commission for England created a modified Romsey constituency called Romsey and Southampton North, to reflect the fact that two wards of Southampton form part of the constituency (though one ward had in fact formed part of the constituency since 1997).

Sandra Gidley lost to the Conservatives in the 2010 general election when she contested the new seat. She was succeeded by Caroline Nokes.

Members of Parliament

Elections

Elections in the 2000s

Elections in the 1990s

Elections in the 1980s

See also
List of parliamentary constituencies in Hampshire

Notes and references 

Constituencies of the Parliament of the United Kingdom established in 1983
Constituencies of the Parliament of the United Kingdom disestablished in 2010
Parliamentary constituencies in Hampshire (historic)
Test Valley